Kakkakuyil is a 2001 Indian Malayalam-language heist comedy-drama film written and directed by Priyadarshan and produced by Lissy. It stars Mohanlal and Mukesh. The film features songs composed by Deepan Chatterji and background score by S. P. Venkatesh. Kakkakuyil was released on 14 April 2001.

It was remade in Telugu as Tappu Chesi Pappu Koodu (2002) and in Tamil as London (2005).
The plot of the movie is based on the 1988 English movie A Fish Called Wanda  with the sub plot of the lead actors seeking shelter in the house of old blind couple borrowed from the Marathi play Ghar Ghar.

Plot
Sivaraman, an unemployed man, comes to Mumbai to find a job. Unfortunately, he loses all his certificates and money but happens to find Govindan Kutty, an old buddy from his native place in Kerala, who is also jobless and wandering in Mumbai. They try to get visa from a travel agency but find no way to gather such a massive amount. Govindan Kutty persuades Sivaraman to participate in a bank robbery planned by Thomas and his gang, including his stammering brother Tyootty and lover Elina.

They join the gang but the plan puts them in more trouble as the robbery ends in vain when they hit Pothuval. Elina secretly informs the police about the robbery and tells that the entire plan was carried out by Thomas, so that she could steal the entire share of the money. Thomas, before getting arrested, hides the money, and the place is kept secret except to his lawyer, Nambeeshan. Elina pretends to be in love with Nambeeshan to find the place where the money is hidden.

Meanwhile, to find a safe cover, Sivaraman and Govindan Kutty plan to impersonate Kunjunni, the grandson of a rich but blind elderly couple, Thampuran and his wife Sethu. They haven't seen their grandchild since his childhood since he resides in the United States and the couple have an estranged relation with their relatives who do not live with them. Sivaraman and Govindan Kutty end up disguising with the body of Govindan Kutty and the voice of Sivaraman to make up for Kunjunni in front of the blind couple, especially the sharp-eared alert grandfather.

Pothuval, who knows Govindan Kutty before and who served as a former servant and house-caretaker to the blind couple, makes several attempts to make the old man learn the truth but all of them fail knowingly or unknowingly much to the luck of Sivaraman and Govindan Kutty. While successfully carrying on, they are interrupted by Radhika Menon who disguises herself as the lover of Kunjunni. She calls on all the estranged relatives of the couple by mocking them. The relatives arrive in the absence of Sivaraman. Finding no way-out, Govindan Kutty pretends to have fainted unconscious and is hospitalised. Sivaraman comes to his rescue and says that he is Dr. Gopalakrishnan, a friend of Kunjunni from the United States. Sivaraman and Govindan Kutty get angry at Radhika and they insult her in a comical argument.

After many successful and comical escapades during their drama, Govindan Kutty tries to steal the Lord Krishna statue so that he can fetch a huge amount of money by selling it, for which he places a teapoy in the staircase to injure the blind elderly lady which keeps all others out of the house for sometime. Sivaraman engages in a fight with Govindan Kutty when he tries to leave with the statue he had stolen. The old man accuses his relatives for the accident and asks all his relatives to leave immediately after learning that they were greedy for his wealth. While he was reprimanding the relatives, the duo learn that the elderly couple had become blind in a car accident decades ago, in which their son and daughter-in-law (Kunjunni's parents) had died. Sivaraman and Govindan Kutty become desperate as the date for the visa payment nears. Radhika gives them the money for the visa and asks them to leave the house. Sivaraman and Govindan Kutty accept the money and leave the house.

Upon leaving, they discover that the visa agency was a fake. Having lost all their resources, Govindan Kutty plans to start a new business with the money they have. Sivaraman disagrees to take the money and asks Govindan Kutty not to take the money which they have got for cheating on the innocent old couple. Govindankutty leaves Sivaraman in anger taking the money with him. Meanwhile, a sorrowful Pothuval informs Thampuran about Kunjunni's death. Later, Radhika also reveals to the old man that she is Kunjunni's actual lover and her real name is 'Revathy'. She also tells him that Kunjunni tragically died in America in a construction-site accident and she had come to inform this. But, after seeing the drama that was taking place which kept the old couple happy, cheerful, and hopeful, she also joined the duo. Sivaraman hears the truth and returns to the old man and confesses all his mistakes. The old man asks him to continue the drama in front of his wife Sethu, who loves her grandson above all and will die of shock on the spot if she learns the tragic truth. Sethu comes and calls Kunjunni, but she gets no replies but finally gets hold of Govindan Kutty's arms who has returned in remorse. The emotional old man hugs both Sivaraman and Govindan Kutty. And, while going back, Radhika promises Thampuran that she will return again. Thampuran, Sivaraman, and Govindan Kutty have a funny moment together.

In the closing scene it is shown that Thomas and Tyootty have started a new humbug. Nambeeshan has gone back to his native place and has started farming and his ex-wife marries a younger man. Pothuval starts an anti-alcohol society, and the future plans of Elina remain unknown.

Cast

 Mohanlal as Sivaraman / Kunjunni's sound (Fake)
 Mukesh as Govindan Kutty / Kunjunni's body (Fake)
 Nedumudi Venu as 'Thampuran', Kunjunni's blind grandfather
 Innocent as Pothuval
 Jagathy Sreekumar as Advocate Nambeeshan
 Cochin Haneefa as Thomas 
 Jagadish as Tyootty, Thomas' stammering brother
 Kaviyoor Ponnamma as Sethulakshmi Bai 'Thampuratti', Kunjunni's blind grandmother
 Arzoo Govitrikar as Radhika Menon / Revathy, Kunjunni's lover
 Sucheta Khanna as Elina 
 Sukumari as Savitri, Nambeeshan's wife
 Shalu Menon as Shalini, Devooty's daughter
 Augustine as Rama Varma, real Kunjunni's uncle
 Poornima Anand as Thampuran and Thampuratti's daughter
 Suchitra Murali as Madhavan's daughter
 Manka Mahesh as Devooty, Thampuran and Thampuratti's daughter
 T. P. Madhavan as Dy. S.P Madhava Varma, Thampuran's younger brother
 James Stalin as Ramettan, Devooty's husband
 Ajayan Adoor as Doctor Rajan 
 Ambalapuzha Raju (Sarathchandra Babu) as Shop Owner
 Vallathol Unnikrishnan as Thampuran's son-in-law
 Suniel Shetty as the real Kunjunni (cameo)
 Shweta Menon as Dancer in the song Alare Govinda
 Ramya Krishnan as Dancer in the song Megharagam Nerukil

Production 
Jyothika was selected as lead actress but was later replaced due to further commitments.

Soundtrack

The hit songs in the film were composed by Deepan Chatterji with lyrics by Gireesh Puthenchery. S. P. Venkatesh composed the background music. The soundtrack album was released on 1 January 2001 by East Coast Audio Entertainments.

References

External links
 

2001 films
2000s Malayalam-language films
Malayalam films remade in other languages
Films shot in Mumbai
Films shot at Ramoji Film City
Films directed by Priyadarshan